Aïn Boudinar is a town and commune in Mostaganem Province, Algeria. It is located in Kheïr Eddine District. According to the 1998 census it has a population of 5,241.

References

Communes of Mostaganem Province
Mostaganem Province